"Home Brew" is an episode of the BBC sitcom The Green Green Grass. It was screened on 15 January 2009, as the second episode of the fourth series.

Synopsis

Whilst searching through the loft, Boycie finds some ancient scrolls and paperwork left behind by the old squire. He also finds a medieval recipe for a traditional local liquor called 'Ye Potato Cyder'. The recipe is accompanied by a royal charter allowing Boycie to make and sell the liquor. With the help of his staff he goes into full-scale business building a distillery in his barn and buying up all the potatoes in the locality. Unfortunately his success attracts two people he thought he'd never see again.

Episode cast

Production, broadcast and reception

Writing
This episode was written by John Sullivan. The on-screen credits state Sullivan was the sole writer, however the official website and BBC Press Office state that writer Keith Lindsay co-wrote this episode.

Broadcast and reception
During its original airing, the episode had a viewing figure of 4.02 million, in the 8:30pm time slot it was shown. This episode is only the second episode to be aired on a Thursday evening. This episode was simulcast on BBC HD.

Continuity
The Driscoll Brothers return for the first time since ‘’’Brothers and Sisters’’’ (2006).
The hidden object buried in ‘’’Brothers and Sisters’’’ (2006) is revealed to be 5 million Spanish pesetas in cash.

Locations
This episode is set almost entirely within the Boyce's home.

Notes
 The Driscoll Brothers make their third appearance on the Green Green Grass.

References

British TV Comedy Guide for The Green Green Grass
BARB viewing figures

2009 British television episodes
The Green Green Grass episodes